The Bolivian National Congress 1982–1985 was elected on 29 June 1980.

Chamber of Deputies

Chamber of Senators

Presidents of the National Congress

Presidents of the Chamber of Senators

Presidents of the Chamber of Deputies 

UDP – Democratic and Popular Union (Unidad Democratica y Popular). Electoral alliance formed by
Nationalist Revolutionary Movement of the Left, MNRI;
Communist Party of Bolivia, PCB;
Revolutionary Left Movement, MIR;
Popular Movement for National Liberation, MPLN;
Socialist Party-Sabino Tito Atahuichi, PS-Atahuichi;
Organization of Revolutionary Unity, OUR;
Center for the Study of Natural Resources, CERNA;
Workers' Vanguard Party, VO.

MNR-A – Revolutionary Nationalist Movement-Alliance (Movimiento Nacionalista Revolucionario-Alianza). Electoral alliance formed by
Revolutionary Nationalist Movement, MNR;
Communist Party of Bolivia (Marxist–Leninist), PCML;
Nationalist Revolutionary Movement of the Left-One, MNRI-1.

ADN – Nationalist Democratic Action.

PS-1 – Socialist Party-One.

FDR-NA – Democratic Revolutionary Front-New Alternative (Frente Democrático Revolucionario – Nueva Alternativa). Electoral alliance formed by
Christian Democratic Party, PDC;
Alliance of the National Left, ALIN;
Socialist Party-Guillermo Aponte Burela, PS-Aponte;
Offensive of the Democratic Left, OID;
Revolutionary Workers Party Trotskyist-Posadist, POR-TP.

PRA – Authentic Revolutionary Party.

MNRU – United Revolutionary Nationalist Movement.

MIN – Movement of the National Left;

FSB – Bolivian Socialist Falange.

MITKA-1 – Indian Movement Tupaj Katari-One.

MITKA – Indian Movement Tupaj Katari.

Notes

Political history of Bolivia